Diadromus is a genus of parasitoid wasps belonging to the family Ichneumonidae.

The species of this genus are found in Europe and Northern America.

Species:
 Diadromus albiceps Strobl, 1901 
 Diadromus albinotatus (Gravenhorst, 1829)
 Diadromus pulchellus

References

Ichneumonidae
Ichneumonidae genera